Ubiquinone biosynthesis protein COQ9, mitochondrial, also known as coenzyme Q9 homolog (COQ9), is a protein that in humans is encoded by the COQ9 gene.

Function 

This locus represents a mitochondrial ubiquinone biosynthesis gene. The encoded protein is likely necessary for biosynthesis of coenzyme Q10, as mutations at this locus have been associated with autosomal-recessive neonatal-onset primary coenzyme Q10 deficiency.

Clinical significance 

It may be associated with Coenzyme Q10 deficiency.

Model organisms

Model organisms have been used in the study of COQ9 function. A conditional knockout mouse line, called Coq9tm1a(KOMP)Wtsi was generated as part of the International Knockout Mouse Consortium program — a high-throughput mutagenesis project to generate and distribute animal models of disease to interested scientists.

Male and female animals underwent a standardized phenotypic screen to determine the effects of deletion. Twenty two tests were carried out on homozygous mutant mice and one significant abnormality was observed: females displayed hyperactivity in an open field test.

References

External links

Further reading

Genes mutated in mice